Cathrine Dyngvold (born 17 April 1989) is a Norwegian footballer who plays as a forward for 1. divisjon club Amazon Grimstad.

Early life
Born and raised in Kristiansand, Dyngvold began playing football for local club, Just IL, as a youth. She began playing for Bømlo at age 12 and scored 42 goals in just over two seasons with the club. In 2003 at age 14, she captained the squad that clinched the Norway Cup scoring two goals during the final match.  Starting at age 16, she played for Haugar for 1 1/2 years.

Playing career

Club

Klepp IL
Dyngvold began playing for Klepp IL in the Toppserien, the top-level league in Norway, in 2008.

Göteborg FC

In September 2012, Dyngvold signed a two-year contract with Swedish side, Kopparbergs/Göteborg FC in the Damallsvenskan, the top division of women's soccer in Sweden. She made her debut for the club during the Svenska Supercupen (Swedish Super Cup), an annual cup played between the previous season's Damallsvenskan champion and the winners of the Svenska Cupen (Swedish Cup). Dyngvold was subbed in during the 110th minute after the match went into overtime in a 2–2 draw against Damallsvenskan champions, Tyresö FF. Göteborg won 4–2 during penalty kicks with Dyngvold scoring the deciding penalty.

Dyngvold made her regular season debut for Göteborg during a 1–1 draw against Linköping FC on 17 April 2013. She scored her first goal on 13 June in a 5–1 victory over Mallbackens IF.

Honors and awards

Team
 Winner, Swedish Super Cup Women, 2013

References

External links
 Kopparbergs/Göteborg FC player profile
 Klepp IL player profile
 

1989 births
Living people
Sportspeople from Kristiansand
Norwegian women's footballers
Women's association football forwards
BK Häcken FF players
Damallsvenskan players
Expatriate footballers in Sweden
Norwegian expatriate women's footballers
Norwegian expatriate sportspeople in Sweden
Klepp IL players
Toppserien players